The Flint Farm is a historic farmhouse in Andover, Massachusetts.  It was built in 1810 for farmer John Flint, and remained in the family until it was sold by his grandchildren in 1894.  It is a two-story wood-frame structure with a hip roof and two side chimneys.  Its main facade is five bays wide, with asymmetrically placed windows. The center entrance is flanked by pilasters and topped by a fanlight window and a cornice.  The house is a comparatively ambitious and sophisticated Federal style house for a rural area.

The house was listed on the National Register of Historic Places in 1982.

See also
National Register of Historic Places listings in Andover, Massachusetts
National Register of Historic Places listings in Essex County, Massachusetts

References

Farms on the National Register of Historic Places in Massachusetts
Buildings and structures in Andover, Massachusetts
National Register of Historic Places in Andover, Massachusetts